The 2019 New Forest District Council election took place on 2 May 2019 to elect members of New Forest District Council in England. This was on the same day as other local elections. The Conservatives were the only party to stand enough candidates to gain an outright majority, as they were the only party to stand a candidate in more than half the seats, with Liberal Democrats, who defended 2 seats, standing 28 candidates, and Labour, which had no incumbents, standing 30 candidates.

Summary

Election result

|-

Ward results

Ashurst, Copythorne South & Netley Marsh

Barton

Bashley

Becton

Boldre & Sway

Bramshaw, Copythorne North & Minstead

Bransgore & Burley

Brockenhurst & Forest South

Buckland

Butts Ash & Dibden Purlieu

Dibden & Hythe

Downlands & Forest

Fawley, Blackfield & Langley

Fernhill

Fordingbridge

Forest North West
Seat had been unopposed in 2015 election.

Furzedown & Hardley

Holbury & North Blackfield

Hordle

Hythe West & Langdown

Lymington Town

Lyndhurst

Marchwood

Milford

Milton

Pennington

Ringwood East & Sopley
Seat had been unopposed in 2015 election.

Ringwood North

Ringwood South

Totton Central

Totton East

Totton North

Totton South

Totton West

By-elections since 2019

References

2019 English local elections
May 2019 events in the United Kingdom
2019
2010s in Hampshire